Conquer Divide is an American rock band whose members are from the United States, the United Kingdom, and Canada, with one former member coming from Serbia.

History

2013-2017

The band was formed in Michigan by guitarist and songwriter Kristen Sturgis  along with Suzie Reagan. The lineup initially began as a five-piece with the addition of bassist Sarah Stonebraker, drummer Tamara Tadic and singer Kiarely Castillo in 2013. On March 1, 2014, Conquer Divide announced that they had recruited Liverpool based YouTube guitarist Izzy Johnson to become a member, making it a six-piece. A short time later, Suzie was let go and replaced by Texas-based vocalist Janel Duarte. Although their official biography featured on the Artery Recordings website states that they were formed in 2013, the concept for the band had existed since about 2005 according to their producer Joey Sturgis.

On December 2, 2013, Conquer Divide released a lyric video for their first single "Eyes Wide Shut" via YouTuber BryanStars channel. Shortly after the release, they signed to Artery Recordings in mid 2014. The band worked with producer Joey Sturgis (We Came as Romans, Asking Alexandria, The Devil Wears Prada, Blessthefall) on their debut self-titled album. It features guest vocals by Denis Shaforostov (known by his stage moniker Denis Stoff) formerly of Asking Alexandria. It also features a collaboration with Andrew Oliver of I See Stars on the song "Lost". They later posted a video about the process of making the band and the album.

On July 24, 2015, at the Hard Rock Cafe in Las Vegas, Nevada, their album was officially released. The same day, the album reached #4 on the iTunes Metal Chart and ranked #8 on Billboard's Top HeatSeekers chart.  On May 24, 2016, the band released a video for their song 'What's Left Inside' which held steady on Billboard's top 40 Mainstream Rock chart for over six weeks, peaking at #23 in August 2016. They were the first band on Artery Recordings to have a song in active top 40 rock rotation according to a statement made by the label's then-president Shan Dan Horan on his personal Facebook page.

The band went on to support the release of their album on the Allstars Tour, which went across North America. They also played festivals such as South By Southwest, South By So What and Treasure Fest supporting Crown The Empire, Beartooth, In This Moment, Motionless In White, Attila, The Color Morale, Chiodos, and Enter Shikari. The band also toured across North America with Upon A Burning Body, Dance Gavin Dance, Iwrestledabearonce, Capture The Crown, Slaves, Outline In Color, Alesana, Dayshell, A Skylit Drive, Oceano, Within The Ruins, The Browning, and The Funeral Portrait. 

On March 10, 2016, vocalist Janel Duarte announced that Izzy Johnson was temporarily unable to tour with the band due to wrist surgery. She was replaced by former Hopeless Records's SycAmour member Blake Howard for one tour.

During 2015, their music video for "Nightmares" was featured daily in Journeys stores nationwide. "What's Left Inside" was also featured nationwide in Journey's stores in 2016. Guitarist Kristen Sturgis released a playthrough video of their single "Nightmares" via Guitar World on August 4, 2015. 
The band has also seen success on Japanese charts after partnering with Japanese label Five One Inc in February 2016. They released a lyric video for the unplugged version of "Eyes Wide Shut" exclusive for Japan, on May 24, 2016. 
"Sink Your Teeth Into This" was featured in an NHL commercial for the Detroit Red Wings hockey team via Windsor-Detroit's 89x CIMX-FM radio station.

On June 22, 2017, a tour with I Set My Friends On Fire and Arsonists Get All The Girls was announced. Later the same year, they toured with Famous Last Words.

2020-2022

On August 6, 2020, after a brief hiatus, the band released their first song since 2015, "Chemicals", along with an accompanying music video, featuring Canadian drummer Samantha Landa (ex-Nervosa). Chemicals went on to receive critical acclaim and was hailed as "a contender for best hard rock / metalcore crossover of the year" by Alternative Press magazine, and was later picked up by SiriusXM Octane.
On August 14, 2020, they released a cover of Billie Eilish's "Bad Guy" which was picked up by SiriusXM Octane's Accelerator and landed the number 17 spot on their Octane Costume Covers Countdown Contest out of 100 active rock cover nominations.

On May 11, 2021, they released a new single titled "Messy", with the music video featuring all band members. Unlike many of their previous songs, "Messy" is entirely sung by clean vocalist Kia Castillo. Messy was added into regular rotation on Sirius XM Octane and reached number 6 on the Foundations Chart, as well as number one most added to Billboard's Hard Rock Indicator Chart. They released a version featuring Kellin Quinn of Sleeping With Sirens on July 16, 2021.

On October 19, 2021, the band announced on social media that they would be direct support for Attack Attack in 2022. The band also announced a 2022 fall tour supporting Outline In Color, Attack Attack! and Electric Callboy

On May 17, 2022, it was announced that the band signed to Mascot Records by President Ron Burman, who also signed Nickelback to Roadrunner Records in 1999 when he was Senior Vice President of A&R at Roadrunner. To coincide with the announcement, the band released a new standalone single, "Atonement."

On June 8, 2022, they released a single and music video called "Fuckboi" with German metalcore band Electric Callboy via Century Media, on which both bands are featured in the music video. The song is included on Electric Callboy's 2022 album Tekkno.

On October 26, 2022, the band released a new single "Paralyzed," alongside its official music video. They also confirmed that they have begun work on their second studio album. Rocksound Magazine stated the song was "designed for arenas" and a "monster" (of a track), while Metalhammer Magazine stated "Conquer Divide are showing off their own capability for massive earworms with the ultra-addictive Paralyzed... the true MVP of Paralyzed is the absolutely enormous chorus".

On December 14, 2022, it was announced that the band would be playing Welcome To Rockville, supporting Slipknot, Rob Zombie, Queens of the Stoneage, Trivium, Bullet For My Valentine and Black Veil Brides on Thursday, May 18, 2023.

Style, influences and lyrical content
The band's style has been described as metalcore, post-hardcore, alternative rock, and hard rock. Among the band's influences are August Burns Red, We Came as Romans and Parkway Drive, while Demi Lovato is one of Castillo's favorite singers. Others have noted similarities in the band's sound to metalcore bands such as Attack Attack! which has led them to be labeled "scenecore" by MetalSucks.

The lyrical content of the band's music is inspired mainly by personal experiences, which include dealings with prior band members, family, addiction, and relationships.

Collaborations
Vocalist Kiarely Castillo collaborated with The Plot In You's vocalist Landon Tewers on his self-titled solo project. On December 14, 2015, they released a song together titled "Waste of My Time". She also performed a cover of "Scream" by Michael Jackson with German band Annisokay
Guitarist Kristen Sturgis wrote a vocal melody for Miss May I's song "Turn Back The Time" from their 2015 release Deathless. She also did vocal engineering, gang vocals and translation work on Chunk No Captain Chunk's album Pardon My French in 2013. In 2018, Kristen Sturgis worked with popular YouTuber Meytal Cohen on an all-female rendition of Asking Alexandria's song "Into The Fire" for her new "Co-Lab" video series. Kiarely traded places with Sleeping With Sirens frontman Kellin Quinn in November 2020 on a "Freaky Friday" episode for Joey Sturgis Tones where Kellin Quinn sang "Chemicals" and Kiarely sang "P.S. Missing You" by Sleeping With Sirens. In April 2022, It was announced that Conquer Divide would be featured on Electric Callboy's upcoming album Tekkno, on the song Fuckboi, which was co-written by Kristen Sturgis.

Awards
Their song "At War" was nominated for "Best Song" at the 2015 Relentless Kerrang Awards 

Their cover of "Bad Guy" by Billie Eilish was nominated for "BigUns of the year" in 2020 by SiriusXM Octane.

"Paralyzed" was nominated for "Best Metal song of 2022" by Metal Hammer Magazine in the UK.

Members
Current
 Kiarely "Kia" Castillo – clean vocals (2013–2018, 2020–present)
 Janel Duarte – unclean vocals (2014–2018, 2020–present), backing clean vocals (2020–present), bass (2020–present)
 Kristen Sturgis – rhythm guitar (2013–2018, 2020–present), lead guitar (2013–2014)
 Isabel "Izzy" Johnson – lead guitar (2014–2018, 2020–present)
 Samantha "Sam" Landa – drums (2020–present)

Touring
 Blake Howard – lead guitar (March–April 2016, filling in for Izzy)
 Niko Karras – lead guitar (October–November 2022, filling in for Izzy)

Former
 Tamara Tadic – drums (2013–2017)
 Sarah Stonebraker – bass (2013–2015)
 Ashley Colby – bass (2015–2017)
 Suzie Reagan – unclean vocals (2013–2014)

Timeline

Discography
Studio albums

Singles

Other songs

References

External links 
 

2013 establishments in Michigan
Musical groups established in 2013
All-female bands
Post-hardcore groups
Metalcore musical groups from Michigan